Bridgwater is a historic market town and civil parish in Somerset, England. The population was estimated at 41,276 in 2022. Bridgwater is at the edge of the Somerset Levels, in level and well-wooded country. The town lies along both sides of the River Parrett; it has been a major inland port and trading centre since the industrial revolution. Most of its industrial bases still stand today. Its larger neighbour, Taunton, is linked to Bridgwater via a canal, the M5 motorway and the GWR railway line.

Historically, the town had a politically radical tendency. The Battle of Sedgemoor, where the Monmouth Rebellion was finally crushed in 1685, was fought nearby. Notable buildings include the Church of St Mary and Blake Museum, which is a largely restored house in Blake Street and was the birthplace of Admiral Blake in 1598. The town has an arts centre and plays host to the annual Bridgwater Guy Fawkes Carnival.

Etymology
It is thought that the town was originally called Brigg, meaning quay. It has been argued that the name may instead come from the Old English brycg (gang plank) or Old Norse bryggja (quay), though this idea has been opposed on etymological grounds. In the Domesday Book the town is listed as Brugie, while Brugia was also used. After the Norman invasion the land was given to Walter of Douai, hence becoming known variously as Burgh-Walter, Brugg-Walter and Brigg-Walter, eventually corrupted to Bridgwater. An alternative version is that it derives from "Bridge of Walter" (i.e. Walter's Bridge).

History

Bridgwater proper

Bridgwater is mentioned both in the Domesday Book and in the earlier Anglo-Saxon Chronicle dating from around 800, owing its origin as a trade centre to its position at the mouth of the chief river in Somerset. It was formerly part of the Hundred of North Petherton. In a legend of Alfred the Great, he burnt some cakes while hiding in the marshes of Athelney near Bridgwater, after the Danish invasion in 875, while in 878 the major engagement of the Battle of Cynwit may have been at nearby Cannington.

William Briwere was granted the lordship of the Manor of Bridgwater by King John in 1201, and founded Bridgwater Friary. Through Briwere's influence, King John granted three charters in 1200; for the construction of Bridgwater Castle, for the creation of a borough, and for a market. Bridgwater Castle was a substantial structure built in Old Red Sandstone, covering a site of 8 or 9 acres (32,000 to 36,000 m2). The main entrance opposite the Cornhill was built with a pair of adjacent gates and drawbridges. In addition to a keep, located at the south-east corner of what is now King Square, documents show that the complex included a dungeon, chapel, stables and a bell tower. Built on the only raised ground in the town, the castle controlled the crossing of the town bridge. The foundations of the tower forming the north-east corner of the castle are buried beneath Homecastle House. William Briwere also founded St John's hospital which, by the time of the Dissolution of the Monasteries under Henry VIII, was worth the substantial sum of almost 121 pounds, as well as starting the construction of the town's first stone bridge. William Briwere also went on to found the Franciscan Bridgwater Friary in the town.

During the 13th century Second Barons' War against Henry III, Bridgwater was held by the barons against the King. Other charters were granted by Henry III in 1227 (confirmed in 1318, 1370, 1380), which gave Bridgwater a guild merchant which was important for the regulation of trade, allowing guild members to trade freely in the town, and to impose payments and restrictions upon others. Bridgwater's peasants under Nicholas Frampton took part in the Peasants' Revolt of 1381, sacking Sydenham House, murdering the local tax collectors and destroying the records.

Bridgwater was incorporated by charter of Edward IV (1468), confirmed in 1554, 1586, 1629 and 1684. Parliamentary representation as a borough constituency began in 1295 and continued until 1870, when the original borough constituency was disenfranchised for corruption; from 4 July 1870 the town was incorporated within the county constituency of West Somerset. When Parliamentary seats were redistributed for the 1885 general election, a new county division of Bridgwater was created. A variety of markets were granted to the town during the Middle Ages including a Midsummer fair (on 24 June), one at the beginning of Lent was added in 1468, and one at Michaelmas. The importance of these markets and fairs for the sale of wool and wine, and later of cloth, declined after medieval times. The shipping trade of the port revived after the construction of the new dock in 1841, and corn and timber have been imported for centuries.

Gunpowder Plotter Guy Fawkes is remembered during the carnival season, including a grand illuminated procession through Bridgwater town centre, which culminates in the Squibbing. Bridgwater, being staunchly Protestant at the time of the plot celebrated the thwarting of the conspiracy with particular enthusiasm.

In the English Civil War the town and the castle were held by the Royalists under Colonel Edmund Wyndham, a personal acquaintance of the King. British history might have been very different had his wife, Lady (Crystabella) Wyndham, been a little more accurate with a musket shot that missed Oliver Cromwell but killed his aide de camp. Eventually, with many buildings destroyed in the town, the castle and its valuable contents were surrendered to the Parliamentarians on 21 July 1645. The castle itself was deliberately destroyed (slighted) the following year, while in 1651 Colonel Wyndham made arrangements for Charles II to flee to France following the Battle of Worcester.

Following the restoration of the monarchy, in 1663 the non-conformist Reverend John Norman, vicar from 1647 to 1660, was one of several 'religious fanatics' confined to their homes by Lord Stawell's militia. A large religious meeting house, thought to have been Presbyterian, was demolished and its furniture burned on the Cornhill in 1683. By 1688, matters had calmed down enough for a new chapel, Christ Church, to be founded in Dampiet Street, the congregation of which became Unitarian in 1815.

In the 1685 Monmouth Rebellion, the rebel Duke of Monmouth was proclaimed King on the Cornhill in Bridgwater and in other local towns. He eventually led his troops on a night-time attack on the King's position near Westonzoyland. Surprise was lost when a musket was accidentally discharged, and the Battle of Sedgemoor resulted in defeat for the Duke. He was later beheaded at the Tower of London, and nine locals were executed for treason.

The Chandos Glass Cone was built in 1725 as a glasswork firing kiln by James Brydges, 1st Duke of Chandos as part of an industrial development. After a short period of use for glassmaking it was converted for the production of pottery, bricks and tiles, which continued until 1939. The majority of the brickwork cone was demolished in 1943. The bottom  has been preserved and scheduled as an ancient monument.

Bridgwater became the first town in Britain to petition the government to ban slavery, in 1785.

The population of Bridgwater in 1841 was 9,899.

In 1896, the trade unionists of Bridgwater's brick and tile industry were involved a number of strikes. The Salisbury government sent troops to the town to clear the barricades by force after the reading of the Riot Act.

A by-election in 1938 enabled the town to send a message to the government and Hitler, when an Independent anti-appeasement candidate, journalist Vernon Bartlett was elected MP.

In World War II the Bridgwater and Taunton Canal formed part of the Taunton Stop Line, designed to prevent the advance of a German invasion. Pillboxes can still be seen along its length. The first bombs fell on Bridgwater on 24 August 1940, destroying houses on Old Taunton Road, and three men, three women and one child were killed. Later a prisoner of war camp was established at Colley Lane, holding Italian prisoners. During the preparations for the invasion of Europe, American troops were based in the town.

The first council estate to be built was in the 1930s at Kendale Road, followed by those at Bristol Road. The 1950s saw the start of a significant increase in post-war housebuilding, with council house estates being started at Sydenham and Rhode Lane and the former cooperative estate near Durleigh.

On 4 November 2011 West Quay alongside the River Parrett and 19 adjoining properties were evacuated after a  stretch of the retaining wall partially collapsed after heavy rain and flooding. The old hospital in Salmon Parade, which was built in 1813, closed in 2014 and has been replaced with a community hospital in Bower Lane. This provides a maternity unit and 30 inpatient beds. The old hospital site has been sold for development at a price of £1.6 million, and may be turned into a hotel.

Port of Bridgwater

In the medieval period the River Parrett was used to transport Hamstone from the quarry at Ham Hill. Bridgwater was part of the Port of Bristol until the Port of Bridgwater was created in 1348, covering  of the Somerset coast line, from the Devon border to the mouth of the River Axe. Under an 1845 Act of Parliament the Port of Bridgwater extends from Brean Down to Hinkley Point in Bridgwater Bay, and includes parts of the River Parrett (to Bridgwater), River Brue and the River Axe.

Historically, the main port on the river was at Bridgwater; the river was bridged at this point: the first bridge was built in 1200. Quays were built in 1424; another quay, the Langport slip, was built in 1488 upstream of the Town Bridge. A Customs House was sited at Bridgwater, on West Quay; and a dry dock, launching slips and a boat yard on East Quay. The river was navigable, with care, to Bridgwater Town Bridge by  vessels. By trans-shipping into barges at the Town Bridge the Parrett was navigable as far as Langport and (via the River Yeo) to Ilchester. After 1827, it was also possible to transfer goods to Taunton via the Bridgwater and Taunton Canal at Huntworth. A floating harbour was constructed between 1837–1841 and the canal was extended to the harbour. The harbour area contained flour mills, timber yards and chandlers.

Shipping to Bridgwater expanded with the construction of Bridgwater Docks, and reached a peak between 1880 and 1885; with an average of 3,600 ships per year entering the port. Bridgwater also built some 167 ships; the last one was the Irene, launched in 1907. Peak tonnage occurred in 1857, with 142 vessels totalling .

Dunball wharf was built in 1844 by Bridgwater coal merchants, and was formerly linked to the Bristol & Exeter Railway by a rail track which crossed the A38. In 1875, the local landowner built The Dunball Steam Pottery & Brick & Tile Works adjacent to the wharf.

Although ships no longer dock in the town of Bridgwater,  of cargo were handled within the port authority's area in 2006, most of which was stone products via the wharf at Dunball. It is no longer linked to the railway system. The link was removed as part of the railway closures made as a result of the Beeching Report in the 1960s. Dunball railway station, which had opened in 1873, was closed to both passengers and goods in 1964. All traces of the station, other than "Station Road" have been removed. The wharf is now used for landing stone products, mainly marine sand and gravels dredged in the Bristol Channel.

Sedgemoor District Council acts as the Competent Harbour Authority for the port, and has provided pilotage services for all boats over  using the river since 1998, when it took over the service from Trinity House. Pilotage is important because of the constant changes in the navigable channel resulting from the large tidal range, which can exceed  on spring tides.

Its historic estates include the manor of Sydenham.

Governance

The Local Government Act 1972 removed the historic status of Bridgwater as a Borough, as it became part of the district of Sedgemoor, which has its headquarters in King Square.

Bridgwater Town Council, which is based at Bridgwater Town Hall, was created in 2003, with sixteen elected members representing six wards of the town; Bower (three), Eastover (two), Hamp (three), Quantock (three), Sydenham (three) and Victoria (two). With powers or functions over allotments, bus shelters, making of byelaws, cemeteries, clocks, crime prevention, entertainment and arts, highways, litter, public buildings, public conveniences, recreation, street lighting, tourism, traffic calming, community transport and war memorials.

Bridgwater and West Somerset is a county constituency represented in the House of Commons of the Parliament of the United Kingdom. It elects one Member of Parliament (MP) by the first past the post system of election. The current MP is Ian Liddell-Grainger, a member of the Conservative Party.

In 2018 Diogo Rodrigues became the first Portuguese national to be elected as a Mayor in England, also becoming Bridgwater's youngest ever mayor.

Members of Parliament
The Bridgwater constituency has been represented in Parliament since 1295. After the voting age was lowered in January 1970, Susan Wallace became the first 18-year-old to vote in the UK, during the 1970 Bridgwater by-election that elected Tom King, who took the title Baron King of Bridgwater in 2001.
At the 2010 General Election, Bridgwater became part of the new Bridgwater and West Somerset constituency.

Bridgwater was in the South West England constituency for elections to the European Parliament, prior to Brexit in 2020.

Twinning
Bridgwater is twinned with the following towns and cities:
Uherské Hradiště, in the Czech Republic, since 1992 
La Ciotat in France, since 1957
Homberg, Efze in Germany, since 1992
Marsa in Malta, since 2006
Priverno in Italy, since 2015
Camacha, Madeira Autonomous Region, Portugal, since 2019

Geology
Bridgwater is centred on an outcrop of marl in an area dominated by low-lying alluvial deposits. There are local deposits of gravels and sand. It is situated in a level and well-wooded area, on the edge of the Somerset Levels. To the north are the Mendip range and on the west the Quantock hills. The town lies along both sides of the River Parrett,  from its mouth, which then flows to discharge into the Bridgwater Bay National Nature Reserve. It consists of large areas of mud flats, saltmarsh, sandflats and shingle ridges, some of which are vegetated. It has been designated as a Site of Special Scientific Interest since 1989, and is designated as a wetland of international importance under the Ramsar Convention. The risks to wildlife are highlighted in the local Oil Spill Contingency Plan.

Climate

Along with the rest of South West England, Bridgwater has a temperate climate which is generally wetter and milder than the rest of the country. Seasonal temperature variation is less extreme than most of the United Kingdom because of the adjacent sea temperatures. In the summer the Azores high pressure affects the south-west of England, however convective cloud sometimes forms inland, reducing the number of hours of sunshine. Annual sunshine rates are slightly less than the regional average of 1,600 hours. Most of the rainfall in the south-west is caused by Atlantic depressions or by convection. Most of the rainfall in autumn and winter is caused by the Atlantic depressions, which is when they are most active. In summer, a large proportion of the rainfall is caused by sun heating the ground leading to convection and to showers and thunderstorms. About 8–15 days of snowfall is typical. November to March have the highest mean wind speeds, and June to August have the lightest winds. The predominant wind direction is from the south-west.

Demography
Bridgwater had a population of 35,800 according to the 2001 census (up from 22,718 in 1951, 3,634 in 1801, and 7,807 in 1831).

Economy

As early as 1300, the port exported wheat, peas and beans to Ireland, France and Spain, and by 1400 was also exporting cloth from Somerset and the adjoining counties. By 1500 it was the largest port in Somerset, later becoming the fifth largest in England, until eclipsed by Bristol in the 18th century. In its heyday, imports included wine, grain, fish, hemp, coal and timber. Exports included wheat, wool, cloth, cement, bricks and tiles. Unlike Bristol, Bridgwater was never involved in the slave trade and, in 1785, was the first town in Britain to petition the government to ban it.

The Bridgwater ship the Emanuel was one of three that took part in Martin Frobisher's 1577 search for the Northwest Passage. In 1828, 40 ships were registered in the port, averaging 60 tons each.

Industry
Bridgwater was the leading industrial town in Somerset and remains a major centre for manufacturing. A major manufacturing centre for clay tiles and bricks in the 19th century, including the famous "Bath brick", were exported through the port. In the 1890s there were a total of 16 brick and tile companies, and 24 million bricks per annum were exported during that decade alone. These industries are celebrated in the Somerset Brick and Tile Museum on East Quay.

These industries collapsed in the aftermath of World War II due to the failure to introduce mechanisation, although the automated Chilton Tile Factory, which produced up to 5 million tiles each year, lasted until 1968. The importance of the Bath Brick declined with the advent of detergents and other cleaning products. Dunware ponds used to make bricks and can still be found along the paths.

During the 19th century, Castle House (originally named Portland Castle after Portland cement), reputedly the first domestic house in the UK to be built from concrete, was constructed in 1851 by John Board, a local brick and tile manufacturer. The building is now Grade II* listed, and in 2004 was featured in the BBC television programme Restoration.

In the 19th century, Bridgwater was also home to a number of iron foundries. George Hennet's Bridgwater Iron Works worked on bridges, railways and machinery for Brunel and Robert Stephenson. This location allowed the import by boat of raw materials from Wales and the dispatch of finished work to south Devon using the Bristol & Exeter Railway. The carriage workshops for the latter were on an adjacent site. The works passed to his son and then traded as Hennet, Spink & Else. Some of the ironwork was produced for the Royal Albert Bridge at Saltash, Cornwall. In 1873 it became the Bridgwater Engineering Company Limited but this failed in 1878. W&F Wills Ltd produced steam locomotives and fingerposts.

At the start of World War II, the government built a factory to manufacture high explosives at Puriton near Bridgwater. Called ROF Bridgwater, the plant is today owned by BAE Systems and closed after decommissioning was completed in July 2008.

British Cellophane Ltd, a joint venture between La Cellophane SA and Courtaulds opened a major factory producing cellophane in Bridgwater 1937. The factory produced Bailey bridges during World War II for the invasion of Europe. Bought by UCB Films in 1996, the town suffered a blow in 2005 when Innovia Films closed the cellophane factory. At one time the factory employed around 3,000 people, although at the time of closure this had been reduced to just 250. However recovery has begun with the establishment of new businesses on the Express Park business park including the relocation of Gerber Juice and new enterprises Toolstation and Interpet as well as the Exel centre for the NHS Logistics Authority.

Bridgwater is now a major centre of industry in Somerset, with industries including the production of plastics, engine parts, industrial chemicals, and foods. Bowerings Animal Feed Mill is now the only industry still located at the docks. Being close to the M5 motorway and halfway between Bristol and Exeter, Bridgwater is also home to two major distribution centres, while retailer Argos has a regional distribution centre based at Huntworth. A new £100 m Regional Agricultural Business Centre opened in 2007, following construction which began in 2006.

Landmarks

Bridgwater is home to the Somerset Brick and Tile Museum, built on part of the former Barham Brothers site (brick and tile manufacturers between 1857 and 1965). Castle House was built in 1851 and was one of the first to make extensive use of concrete demonstrating "an innovative interpretation of traditional masonry features in concrete".

The Bridgwater Town Mill, originating in the Middle Ages is located at the end of Blake Street, and there are plans to develop it as an extension to the Blake Museum

A house in Blake Street, largely restored, is believed to be the birthplace of Robert Blake in 1598, and is now the Blake Museum. It was built in the late 15th or early 16th century, and has been designated by English Heritage as a grade II* listed building. His statue from 1898 by F. W. Pomeroy has been repositioned from the front of the Corn Exchange to face down Cornhill. The public library by E Godfrey Page dates from 1905.

Sydenham House was previously a manor estate built in the early 16th century, which was refronted and rebuilt after 1613. Its owners were on the losing side in the Civil War and again in the Monmouth Rebellion. It now stands in the grounds of the former British Cellophane plant. In 2012 EDF purchased the site, including the Grade II listed 16th century building. In 2015 the industrial site was razed to the ground. It is intended for construction of temporary accommodation for 1,000 workers involved in the construction of Hinkley Point C nuclear power station.

Transport

As trade expanded during the Industrial Revolution, Bridgwater was linked to Taunton by the Bridgwater and Taunton Canal (1827), although initially it ran from a basin south of Bridgwater at Huntworth. As trade grew docks were built in the town, linked to an extension of the canal, with both opening in 1841. The docks were dredged by a scraper-dredger Bertha similar to the one Isambard Kingdom Brunel had designed for the Bristol Floating Harbour. 14 June 1841 saw the opening of the Bristol & Exeter Railway from Bristol to Bridgwater. The railway also opened a coach and wagon works in the town; the last of the buildings was in 2005 scheduled for demolition. Bridgwater railway station, designed by Brunel is now a Grade II listed building. An end to the unequal competition between rail and canal came in 1867 when the Bristol & Exeter Railway purchased the canal. A number of local branches were also built, for example to serve the Northgate Brewery (now replaced by a car park north of Angel Crescent) and the former British Cellophane factory. The Somerset and Dorset branch line to Edington was opened in 1890. Its former Bridgwater station is now occupied by J Sainsbury.

The importance of shipping and the docks started to decline after 1886, the year in which the opening of the Severn Tunnel caused a severe drop in coal imports by sea. The situation worsened as the railways were extended into Somerset and beyond, and ships became too big for the port. The last commercial use of the docks was when coal imports ceased on 31 July 1971, and although they now house a marina they are currently little used. The surrounding quays have been developed for housing, although the remains of wooden quays on the riverbank can still be seen. All but a small remnant of the mump (a huge mound of spoil from the original dock excavations) was removed in the 1980s to make way for the development on the north side of the dock. Due to the port, ship building was also an important industry, and around 140 ships were built in the town during the 19th century by companies including David Williams, Joseph Gough, Watsons and William Lowther. F J Carver and Son owned a small dry dock on East Quay and constructed the last ship to be built in the town — the Irene. The former associated industry of rope making is commemorated in street furnishings and paving on East Quay and in the name of Ropewalk street.

The Drove Bridge, which marks the current extent of the Port of Bridgwater is the nearest to the mouth and the newest road bridge to cross the river. Upstream of this is the retractable Telescopic Bridge, built in 1871 to the design of Sir Francis Fox, the engineer for the Bristol & Exeter Railway. It carried a railway siding over the river to the docks, but had to be movable, to allow boats to proceed upriver. It was manually operated for the first eight months, and then powered by a steam engine, reverting to manual operation in 1913, when the steam engine failed. The bridge was last opened in 1953, and the traverser section was demolished in 1974, but public outcry at the action resulted in the bridge being listed as a Scheduled Ancient Monument, and the rest of the bridge was kept. It was later used as a road crossing, until the construction of the Chandos road bridge alongside it, and is now only used by pedestrians. Parts of the steam engine were moved to Westonzoyland Pumping Station Museum in 1977.

The next bridge is the Town Bridge. There has been a bridge here since the 13th century, when Bridgwater was granted a charter by King John. The present bridge was designed by R. C. Else and G. B. Laffan, and the  cast iron structure was completed in 1883. It replaced an earlier bridge, which was the first cast iron bridge to be built in Somerset when it was completed in 1797. The stone abutments of that bridge were reused by the later bridge, which formed the only road crossing of the river in Bridgwater until 1958. Above the bridge there were two shoals, called The Coals and The Stones, which were a hazard to barge traffic on the river, and bargees had to choose carefully when to navigate the river, to ensure that there was sufficient water to carry them over these obstructions. In March 1958 a new reinforced concrete road bridge, the Blake Bridge, was opened as part of a bypass to take traffic away from the centre of Bridgwater. It now carries the A38 and A39 roads. On the southern edge of Bridgwater there is a bridge which carries the Bristol & Exeter Railway across the River Parrett. Isambard Kingdom Brunel designed a brick bridge, known as the Somerset Bridge, with a  span but a rise of just . Work started in 1838 and was completed in 1841. Brunel left the scaffold supporting the centre of the bridge in place as the foundations were still settling but was forced to remove it in 1843 to reopen the river for navigation. Brunel demolished the brick arch and had replaced it with a timber arch within six months without interrupting the traffic on the railway. This was in turn replaced in 1904 by a steel girder bridge. Slightly further east is a modern concrete bridge which carries the M5 motorway over both the river and the railway line. It was started in 1971 and opened in 1973.

Bridgwater is served twice daily by Berrys Coaches 'Superfast' service to and from London.

Education

The primary and infant schools in Bridgwater include: Eastover Community Primary School, Hamp Community Junior School, Sedgemoor Manor School, St John and St Francis Primary School, St Joseph's Catholic Primary School, St Mary's Primary School, Somerset Bridge Primary School, Spaxton Church of England Primary School, Westover Green Primary School and Hamp Nursery and Infants School. Secondary schools include: Robert Blake Science College, Brymore Academy, Chilton Trinity School, Bridgwater College Academy which was previously known as Sydenham School and is a Performing and Visual Arts College, and Haygrove School which has specialist Language College status. Special schools in the town include: Elmwood Special School, New Horizon Centre School and Penrose School.

Bridgwater was selected as the first town in the South West, outside Bristol, to be selected for the UK government's Building Schools for the Future (BSF) initiative, which aimed to rebuild and renew nearly every secondary school in England. Within Bridgwater, BSF was to redevelop all of the four secondary schools and two special provision schools at an expected cost of around £100 million. This included the complete relocation and rebuilding of a new school combining both the Haygrove and Penrose Schools. In July 2010, several components of the Bridgwater BSF programme were cancelled and others were singled out for further review. Following a meeting with Education Secretary Michael Gove, Bridgwater MP Ian Liddell-Grainger announced that the fate of all six affected schools would be subject to review, including the ones that were cancelled.

Further Education is provided by Bridgwater and Taunton College which was formerly Bridgwater Technical School. In February 2018 the southern hub of the National College for Nuclear was launched at the Bridgwater campus, intended to service the building and operation of the Hinkley Point C nuclear power station.

Schools which have since closed include: Bridgwater Grammar School For Boys (originally the Poplar School of Engineering And Navigation, then Dr Morgan's Grammar School For Boys, which became Haygrove School with the Somerset County Council introduction of Comprehensive education), Bridgwater Grammar School For Girls, also in Durleigh, and Westover Senior Council School.

Religious sites
Among several places of worship the chief is the Church of St Mary; this has a north porch and windows dating from the 14th century, besides a  slender spire; but it has been much altered by restoration. It possesses a fine painted reredos, and has been designated by English Heritage as a grade I listed building.

There is also Christ Church Unitarian Chapel on Dampiet Street, built in 1688, it still retains many of its original features from 1688 and its remodeling in 1788. It has been designated by English Heritage as a grade II* listed building. 

The Church of St John the Baptist in Blake Place was built by the Revd. John More Capes and designed by John Brown in 1843. Elim Pentecostal Church on Church Street was a public house after being used as a church and is now a shop. There is a Salvation Army Citadel located in Moorland Road, on the Sydenham Estate and St Joseph's Roman Catholic in Binford Place.

Classes in Buddhism and meditation were held in the Quaker Meeting House on Friarn Street. In 2014 the building was put up for auction and purchased by local Muslims to become Bridgwater Islamic Centre.

Arts

Nearing Bridgwater on the M5 motorway it is possible to see the Willow Man sculpture, a striding human figure constructed from willow, sometimes called the Angel of the South (see also Angel of the North).

Bridgwater is the home of Music on the Quantocks, Somerset's most successful music series specialising in world-class classical music. The series also features performance poetry, jazz and folk.  Most events are staged in venues such as churches, barns and halls surrounding Bridgwater and attract audiences up to 850 people at an event. Artists featured have included Sir James Galway, The Sixteen, Nigel Kennedy, The Hilliard Ensemble, The Tallis Scholars, Roger McGough and John Cooper Clarke.

The Bridgwater Arts Centre was opened on 10 October 1946, the first community arts centre opened in the UK with financial assistance from the newly established Arts Council of England. It is situated in a Grade I listed building in the architecturally protected Georgian Castle Street, designed by Benjamin Holloway for the Duke of Chandos, and built over the site of the former castle. Holloway was also the architect of the Baroque Lions building on West Quay, constructed around 1730. Bridgwater Arts Centre was the venue for the first post-war meeting of the Congres Internationaux d'Architecture Moderne in 1947.

Somerset Film (then Somerset Film & Video) opened their community media centre, The Engine Room, in March 2003. The centre allows the public to drop in and use the computers and equipment for free (on certain days) to teach themselves how to edit video, design websites or screen films at open evenings. Cameras and edit suites can also be hired and day courses on using creative software are run regularly.

Castle Street was used as a location in the 1963 film Tom Jones. Horror writer and film journalist Kim Newman was educated at Dr Morgan's school in Bridgwater, and set his 1999 experimental novel Life's Lottery in a fictionalised version of the town (Sedgwater). A sailor who had sailed "from Bridgwater with bricks" and found "There was lice in that bunk in Bridgwater" features in James Joyce's Ulysses (Chapter 16).

In 2013, community radio station Access FM was launched on 104.2 FM. This was the first truly local radio station for the town since BCR FM was bought by Choice Media in 2006 which eventually became The Breeze. Access FM was initiated as a function of Bridgwater's YMCA and as such held the same values as the charity. The community station began with the intentions of providing youth based programming to 16- to 25-year-olds in order to give the younger generation something new and productive to get involved with. Many of the voluntary presenters were aged 16 – 20 and the station acted as the first step into the industry. Access FM had mild success within the community, attending multiple events and marking new ground for local radio in the area. The station was the first in history to provide live broadcast coverage from Bridgwater Guy Fawkes Carnival in 2014.

In October 2015 the station went through a re-branding process under a revised management team, creating Sedgemoor FM, which launched on 4 April 2016. Sedgemoor FM broadcasts on 104.2FM across Bridgwater and the rest of the district, providing listeners with programming specific for the community. Scheduling consists of a variety of informative and entertaining radio shows including Dave Englefield's Breakfast Show, Sedgemoor Life with Jackie Sealy and The Carnival Show with Andy Bennett, along with local and national news coverage, local events guide, The Lowdown, and Just The Job, which highlights current job vacancies in the area.

Annual events

Bridgwater is now best known for the illuminated "Bridgwater Guy Fawkes Carnival" that attracts around 150,000 people from around the country and overseas. Now held annually on the Saturday after the first Friday of November (i.e. - the nearest Saturday to 5 November), it was original held on the first Thursday of November, later moving to the first Friday. Later in the evening of the Carnival, there is the simultaneous firing of large fireworks (known as squibs) in the street outside the town hall, known as "squibbing".

Bridgwater Fair normally takes place in September — it starts on the last Wednesday in September and lasts four days. The fair takes place on St Matthew's Field, better known locally as the Fair Field. The fair is now a funfair, ranked as second largest in England after the Nottingham Goose Fair. It originated in 1249 as a horse and cattle fair, lasting for eight days near St Matthew's day (21 September), giving the venue its name. During the first weekend of July, the annual "Somerfest" arts festival is held in Bridgwater. The event includes an extensive programme of rock, jazz and classical music, dance, drama and visual arts with national and local participants.

A new annual event was launched in 2014, taking place in May each year. The Bridgwater Science Festival brings science-related family entertainment and activities to town. The event takes place in the Town Hall, and works with local organisations and the University of the West of England.

An annual Food and Drink Festival also takes place each year at the Bridgwater Town Hall. The Bridgwater Food and Drink Festival takes place at the beginning of March each year and features the best in local produce with cooking demonstrations taking place from local chefs.

Sport and leisure

Sport
Bridgwater Town F.C. are a football club based at Fairfax Park. The original version of the club was founded in 1898. The club currently plays in the Southern League Division One South and West. 

Bridgwater & Albion are Somerset's highest-placed rugby team, playing in National League 3 South and are based at College Way. It was founded in 1875. 

The cricket club play at The Parks on Durleigh Road. 
Bridgwater Hockey Club was founded in 1925 and field four men's teams and three women's teams, playing fixtures at 1610 Leisure Centre.

Leisure
East Bridgwater Sports Centre offers badminton courts, outside football pitches, squash courts and a fitness room.

Bridgwater had a series of swimming pools from 1890 until 2009. The first pool, on Old Taunton Road, was replaced by the Bridgwater Lido on Broadway, which was opened in 1960 by the Mayor, Alderman Mrs A. B. Potterton. The lido, which had three pools, a diving bay and paddling pool, was demolished in the late 1980s to make way for a supermarket and to fund the indoor Sedgemoor Splash swimming pool in Mount Street, which opened in 1991. In 2009, after the local council were unable to raise the funds needed to upgrade the pool, it was closed and demolished to make way for another supermarket. A new pool was planned as part of the Building Schools for the Future (BSF) rebuild of Chilton Trinity School, 

The town is both on the route of the Samaritans Way South West and the River Parrett Trail.

Notable people
Admiral Robert Blake (1598–1657) was born in Bridgwater, and attended the local grammar school (Bridgwater Grammar School For Boys). His home is now the Blake Museum and contains details of his career amongst its exhibits of local history and archaeology.
John Chubb (1746–1818), Bridgwater merchant and amateur artist, who painted portraits of his local contemporaries, as well as a number of paintings of Bridgwater street scenes. His work is in the collection of the Blake Museum, Bridgwater.
Donald Crowhurst (1932–1969), who tried to fake a round-the-world solo yacht journey, set up his business in Bridgwater and was a borough councillor.
William Diaper (1685–1717), clergyman and innovative poet, was born in Bridgwater.
Robert Dibble (1882–1963), England rugby player, was born in Bridgwater, and played club rugby for Bridgwater & Albion RFC and Newport RFC.
Sir Paul Dukes (1889–1967) was born in Bridgwater and educated at Caterham School, and went on to be the premier SIS agent in pre-revolution Russia. Known as the "Man with a Hundred Faces", he eluded Bolshevik capture and is still the only man to be knighted based on his exploits as a spy.
Wayne Goss (b. 1978), makeup artist and YouTube personality, was born in Bridgwater.
Peter Haggett (b. 1933), academic geographer and professor at University of Bristol, was educated at Dr Morgan's Grammar School, Bridgwater.
Chris Harris (1942–2014), English performer, director and writer who starred in Into the Labyrinth. He also starred in and directed the pantomime at the Theatre Royal, Bath from 2001.
Charles Kent (1953–2005), England rugby player, was born in Bridgwater.
David Luckes (b. 1969), England and Great Britain hockey player 1989–2000, was brought up in Bridgwater.
Richard (b. 1981) and Simon Mantell (b. 1984), brothers and field hockey players for England, were both born in Bridgwater.
Harry "Breaker" Morant (1864–1902), Anglo-Australian Boer War soldier, was born in Bridgwater.
Kim Newman (b. 1959), science fiction novelist, horror film expert, TV presenter and film critic, was educated at Dr Morgan's Grammar School in Bridgwater.
Henry Phillpotts (1778–1869), Bishop of Exeter 1830–1869, was born in Bridgwater.
John  de Ponz (c.1248-c.1307), royal administrator and senior judge in Ireland, was  born in Bridgwater, and was sometimes known as "John of Bridgwater".
Jean Rees (1914–2004), artist and co-founder of the Bridgwater Arts Centre.
Alexander Scoles (1844–1920), Roman Catholic priest and architect of Catholic churches: he served as parish priest in Bridgwater and designed and built St Joseph's church, Binford Place.
James Sully (1842–1923), psychologist, was born in Bridgwater.
Fanny Talbot (1824–1917), born in Bridgwater, philanthropist and friend of John Ruskin, who donated the first property to the National Trust.
Tommy Woods (1883–1955), England rugby player, was born in Bridgwater and played club rugby for Bridgwater & Albion RFC and Rochdale Hornets.

Notes

References
 

Attribution:

External links

 Port of Bridgwater

 
Market towns in Somerset
Towns in Sedgemoor
Somerset Levels
Monmouth Rebellion